Robert Rey Palacios (born November 8, 1962) is an American former professional baseball catcher who played for the Kansas City Royals of Major League Baseball (MLB).

Career
Palacios attended Kingsborough Community College in his hometown of Brooklyn, New York. In 1982, he signed with the Detroit Tigers as an undrafted free agent, and was assigned to the Rookie-level Bristol Tigers for the 1983 minor league season. Palacios worked his way through the Tigers minor league organization, eventually reaching the Triple-A Toledo Mud Hens in 1987. In 1988, Palacios was traded to the Kansas City Royals, along with Mark Lee, for Ted Power. He would play in five games for the Royals that year, hitting .091. Palacios split time in 1989 and 1990 with the Royals and the Triple-A Omaha Royals, appearing in 96 MLB games and 38 Minor League games. He did not play at any level in 1991, and in 1992 played 29 games with the Double-A Midland Angels of the California Angels minor league organization. In 1993, Palacios played one game with the Baltimore Orioles Triple-A affiliate, the Rochester Red Wings, before retiring.

Personal life
His nephew, Josh, was drafted in the fourth round of the 2016 Major League Baseball draft by the Toronto Blue Jays, and made his MLB debut for Toronto in 2021. Another nephew, Richie, was selected in the 2018 Major League Baseball draft.

References

External links

1962 births
Living people
Kansas City Royals players
Major League Baseball catchers
Baseball players from New York (state)
Bristol Tigers players
Lakeland Tigers players
Birmingham Barons players
Glens Falls Tigers players
Toledo Mud Hens players
Omaha Royals players
Midland Angels players
Rochester Red Wings players